Samson 137A is an Indian reserve of the Samson Cree Nation in Alberta, located within Ponoka County. In the 2016 Canadian Census, it recorded a population of 26 living in 6 of its 6 total private dwellings.

References

Indian reserves in Alberta